Bustros Palace is a palace on Michel Bustros street in the Rmeil area of Beirut, Lebanon. It currently houses the Ministry of Foreign Affairs and Emigrants. It was originally one of the residences of the Bustros family and is today one of the historical landmarks of Beirut. It was damaged by the 2020 Beirut explosions.

Government buildings in Lebanon
Palaces in Lebanon